Lloyd Langford (born 6 August 1983) is a Welsh comedian, comedy writer and voice artist.

Early life and education 
Langford was born in Baglan, Neath Port Talbot. He studied film and television at the University of Warwick; he chose this because film interested him, he wanted to live somewhere new and did not want to lock himself into a vocation so early on. He was regularly MC at Warwick Comedy's weekly Sunday night stand-up show.

Career
Langford was a regular panellist on Ask Rhod Gilbert and has written additional material for TV shows Live at the Apollo, Never Mind the Buzzcocks and The King is Dead. He has provided audience warm-up on QI and been a contributor on Rhod Gilbert's Work Experience. Langford has appeared as a guest on several comedy and panel shows, including Russell Howard's Good News, The News Quiz, The Now Show, 8 Out of 10 Cats, QI and The Dog Ate My Homework, Have You Been Paying Attention (TV2 New Zealand), and has written for other shows.

In August 2010, Langford made the move to television when the BBC commissioned eight episodes of Ask Rhod Gilbert, following a successful pilot earlier in 2010. The show featured Rhod Gilbert, Greg Davies and Langford answering random trivia questions, such as 'Who would win in a race, Usain Bolt or a grizzly bear?', posed by the public and celebrities, with additional celebrity guests on the panel. The show ran for two series.

Langford had been a guest comedian on The Jon Richardson Show. He co-hosted the radio show Rhod Gilbert's Bulging Barrel of Laughs and played Rhod Gilbert's brother on pilot sitcom Rhod Gilbert's Leaving Llanbobl. He occasionally co-hosts Gilbert's weekly show on BBC Radio Wales. Langford has appeared several times on the BBC Radio comedy panel show The Unbelievable Truth and is a co-writer and performer on the BBC Radio Wales sketch show Here Be Dragons; the show won the 2014 Sony Award - Bronze for Best Comedy. He has written jokes for Gilbert, Frankie Boyle and Simon Amstell.

Langford occasionally tours as part of comedy collective GIT with Dan Atkinson and Jon Richardson; his first solo tour was titled Rare Bit, a reference to his Welsh heritage. He has performed at the Edinburgh Festival Fringe multiple times.

In October 2012, along with 463 other players, Langford took part in BBC Radio 5 Live's attempt to set a new Guinness World Record for the 'most players in a continuous 5 a side exhibition match'. This was for BBC Children in Need, along with former footballer and TV pundit Robbie Savage and BBC Radio 5 Live travel reporter Lindsey Chapman.

In the early months of 2019, Langford toured his most recent Edinburgh show, Why the Long Face?, in Australia and New Zealand.

Personal life
Langford is originally from Baglan, Neath Port Talbot. He has lived in Cardiff and London and is currently based in Melbourne, Australia, with his partner, comedian Anne Edmonds. They had a daughter in October 2021.

A republican, Langford opposes the monarchy, a belief described by Chortle as "a deeply held conviction" in a review of his 2014 show Old Fashioned.

Awards

References

External links
Official website

2012 interview

1983 births
Living people
People from Port Talbot
Alumni of the University of Warwick
Welsh comedy writers
Welsh male comedians
Welsh stand-up comedians
Welsh republicans